The Manjhar Kund waterfalls also called the Manjhar K Waterfall is situated in Sasaram, the district headquarters of Rohtas District in Bihar. This waterfall is one of the finest falls in India.

festival
Manjhar Kund comes alive during Raksha Bandhan. This auspicious festival is celebrated with great pomp and splendor. The festival where the Rakhi is tied on to the wrists of the brother by a sister is considered very auspicious at this place. This tradition speaks of the rich tradition within the family where relations matter.

References

Waterfalls of Bihar
Tourist attractions in Rohtas district